Bruckert is a German surname. Notable people with the surname include:

Ingrid Bruckert (born 1952), German field hockey player
Raymond Bruckert (born 1935), Swiss writer

See also
 Brucker

German-language surnames